The bucium (also called trâmbiţă or tulnic) is a type of alphorn used by mountain dwellers and by shepherds in Romania and Moldova. The word is derived from Latin bucinum, originally meaning "curved horn", an instrument used by the Romans. The word is a cognate with English "bugle".

The tube is made from limetree bark, wood, or even (partially) from metal. It is mostly used by shepherds for signaling and communication in the forested mountains, as well as for guiding sheep and dogs. Trâmbiţa (from the old Germanic trumba, "to trumpet") produces sounds altogether different from those of the alphorn.

Under the name trembita it is also used by the Ukrainian Hutsuls and the Polish Gorals.

See also 
 Alphorn
 Trembita
 Erke

External links
 Cântece de tulnic at Moţii.ro
 "Fabrica de tulnice" in Jurnalul Naţional
 "Tulnicăreasa din Târsa" in Formula AS
 "Balada pentru tulnic" in Unirea

Romanian musical instruments
Natural horns and trumpets